Geo Kahani is an entertainment channel of Geo network, broadcasting in Urdu. Title song of channel is sung by Rahat Fateh Ali Khan. Some of the most popular dramas are Naagin, Champa Aur Chambeli and Kiran. Geo Kahani began its transmission in the U.K. from 11 August 2017, ending the four-year run of Geo Tez. The channel closed in the United Kingdom on 1 June 2020. It launched in the United States on 1 June 2020, exclusive to Dish Network.

Programming 

 List of programs broadcast by Geo Kahani

References

External links
 
 

Geo TV
Television channels and stations established in 2013
Television stations in Karachi
2013 establishments in Pakistan